Jordans is a British manufacturer of breakfast cereals and cereal bars founded in 1855. It is based at Biggleswade in Bedfordshire, England.

History

Holme Mills is on Langford Road in Biggleswade, situated next to the River Ivel. A mill was recorded on the site in 1086, as noted in the Domesday Book. It was bought by local farmer William Herbert Jordan in 1855. The mill caught fire in 1894 and burnt down again in 1899. It produced flour until 1972 when W. Jordan (Cereals) Ltd was formed. It was run by Bill and David Jordan, who are brothers and were partners of the company until 2010. W. Jordan (Cereals) Ltd has been dormant since 2010 and the business now operates as The Jordans & Ryvita Company Limited, a subsidiary of Associated British Foods.

There is a factory shop in Langford, Bedfordshire. Its main product it started with, and still produces, is called Crunchy Oats, which is based on granola. 

In 1981, Jordans began production of a cereal bar called Original Crunchy. It now produces four different cereal bars including Frusli which contains 25% fruit, Breakfast Bars, Luxury Absolute Nut Bar and Original Crunchy Bars. Country Crisp was introduced in 1991. Luxury Bars were introduced in 2004.

In 2002, they formed the joint venture 'the Organic and Natural Food Company' with Yeo Valley Organic. It produced vending machines for schools filled with healthy food. In April 2003, the company won a Queen's Awards for Enterprise. In 2005, Bill Jordan was made a MBE.

In September 2007, 20% of the company was sold to Associated British Foods, followed by a further 42% in June 2008, becoming fully owned by ABF by 2013.

Conservation efforts
Jordans use oats which are grown by Conservation Grade farmers around Britain who are paid a premium to create nature-friendly habitats on 10% of their farmed land.

Bill Jordan owns the Nature Reserve at Pensthorpe in Norfolk which is taking part in high profile projects to bring back the rare Eurasian Crane and safeguard British natives such as the red squirrel.

The company is concerned about the rapid decline in the bee population. It started the Big Buzz campaign in May 2009, with the help of the British Beekeepers' Association and the Bumblebee Conservation Trust.

Holme Mill itself became a museum in 2013, with the opening of a visitor centre on the site after production transferred to a new facility in Biggleswade's Saxon Gate development area.

Market share
It is the UK's fourth largest cereals manufacturer after Kelloggs, Nestlé and Weetabix. 25% of their produce is exported, with France being an important market; half their exports go there, and it is the country's best-selling muesli cereal. The brand leader of crunchy muesli in the UK is their Luxury Crunchy.

They belong to the Association of Cereal Food Manufacturers, which is a member of the European Breakfast Cereal Association.

Product range

Cereals
 Muesli (Fruit & Nut, Truly Fruity, Nut & Seed, Fruity Fibre, Natural, Organic, Super Berry)
 Country Crisp – crunchy oat clusters (Strawberry, Raspberry, Honey, Chunky Nut, Dark Chocolate, Raisin) and a low sugar granola (2.9%)
 Frusli – cereal/breakfast bar (Truly Tropical, Apple Sultana & Cinnamon, Raisin & Hazelnut, Cranberry & Apple, Red Berries, Blueberry Burst)
 Crunchy Oats (Super Nutty, Raisin & Honey, Special Fruits & Nuts, Tropical and Super Berry Granola)
 Porridge Oats (Chunky Traditional, Organic and Quick & Creamy)
 Wheatgerm & Wheatbran

Cereal bars
 Original Crunchy – Honey & Almond
 Breakfast in a bar – cereal bar; Fruit & Nut, Cranberry & Raspberry, Maple & Pecan flavours
 Absolute Nut Luxury Bar
 Absolute Berry bar

References

External links
 Jordans Cereals website
 Jordans Big Buzz

News items
 Bees in London in July 2009
 Bees in June 2009
 20% of company sold to ABF in September 2007
 Upton Farm in May 2006
 Independent July 2005

Audio clips
 The Bottom Line' on 18 November 2006

Breakfast cereal companies
Companies based in Bedfordshire
Food and drink companies established in 1855
Cereal bars
Organic farming organizations
British brands
Food manufacturers of the United Kingdom
British companies established in 1855